The 2005–06 Carolina Hurricanes season was the franchise's 34th season, 27th season in the National Hockey League and eighth  as the Hurricanes. The Hurricanes won the Stanley Cup to win the second championship in franchise history. Their first was in 1973, when the team was known as the New England Whalers and played in the World Hockey Association; the Whalers were the inaugural champions of that league.

Offseason
Key dates prior to the start of the season:

The 2005 NHL Entry Draft took place in Ottawa, Ontario, Canada on July 30, 2005.
The free agency period began on August 1.

Free agency
During the free agent signing period following the end of the 2004–05 NHL lockout, Cory Stillman agreed to a three-year contract with the Carolina Hurricanes on August 2, 2005.
On August 6, 2005, Whitney signed a two-year contract with the Carolina Hurricanes of the NHL's Eastern Conference, paying him $1.5 million per year.

Regular season
On Friday, April 7, 2006, the Hurricanes scored three short-handed goals in a 4–3 win over the Washington Capitals.

Final standings

Playoffs

Schedule and results

Regular season

|- align="center" bgcolor="#FFBBBB"
|1||L||October 5, 2005||2–5 || align="left"| @ Tampa Bay Lightning (2005–06) ||0–1–0 || 
|- align="center" bgcolor="#CCFFCC" 
|2||W||October 7, 2005||3–2 SO|| align="left"|  Pittsburgh Penguins (2005–06) ||1–1–0 || 
|- align="center" bgcolor="#FFBBBB"
|3||L||October 8, 2005||2–3 || align="left"| @ New York Islanders (2005–06) ||1–2–0 || 
|- align="center" bgcolor="#CCFFCC" 
|4||W||October 12, 2005||7–2 || align="left"|  Washington Capitals (2005–06) ||2–2–0 || 
|- align="center" bgcolor="#CCFFCC" 
|5||W||October 15, 2005||6–1 || align="left"| @ New Jersey Devils (2005–06) ||3–2–0 || 
|- align="center"
|6||L||October 20, 2005||4–5 OT|| align="left"| @ Toronto Maple Leafs (2005–06) ||3–2–1 || 
|- align="center" bgcolor="#CCFFCC" 
|7||W||October 22, 2005||4–0 || align="left"| @ Washington Capitals (2005–06) ||4–2–1 || 
|- align="center" bgcolor="#CCFFCC" 
|8||W||October 24, 2005||3–2 || align="left"|  Ottawa Senators (2005–06) ||5–2–1 || 
|- align="center" bgcolor="#CCFFCC" 
|9||W||October 26, 2005||4–3 OT|| align="left"|  Boston Bruins (2005–06) ||6–2–1 || 
|- align="center" bgcolor="#CCFFCC" 
|10||W||October 28, 2005||8–6 || align="left"|  Philadelphia Flyers (2005–06) ||7–2–1 || 
|- align="center" bgcolor="#CCFFCC" 
|11||W||October 29, 2005||5–3 || align="left"| @ Pittsburgh Penguins (2005–06) ||8–2–1 || 
|-

|- align="center" bgcolor="#CCFFCC" 
|12||W||November 3, 2005||4–3 || align="left"|  Toronto Maple Leafs (2005–06) ||9–2–1 || 
|- align="center" bgcolor="#CCFFCC" 
|13||W||November 5, 2005||2–0 || align="left"|  Florida Panthers (2005–06) ||10–2–1 || 
|- align="center" bgcolor="#CCFFCC" 
|14||W||November 9, 2005||5–3 || align="left"| @ Buffalo Sabres (2005–06) ||11–2–1 || 
|- align="center" bgcolor="#CCFFCC" 
|15||W||November 11, 2005||1–0 || align="left"| @ Florida Panthers (2005–06) ||12–2–1 || 
|- align="center" bgcolor="#FFBBBB"
|16||L||November 12, 2005||0–9 || align="left"|  Atlanta Thrashers (2005–06) ||12–3–1 || 
|- align="center" bgcolor="#CCFFCC" 
|17||W||November 15, 2005||2–1 || align="left"| @ Ottawa Senators (2005–06) ||13–3–1 || 
|- align="center" bgcolor="#CCFFCC" 
|18||W||November 17, 2005||5–1 || align="left"|  New York Rangers (2005–06) ||14–3–1 || 
|- align="center" bgcolor="#FFBBBB"
|19||L||November 19, 2005||3–4 || align="left"| @ New York Rangers (2005–06) ||14–4–1 || 
|- align="center" bgcolor="#FFBBBB"
|20||L||November 20, 2005||2–5 || align="left"|  Tampa Bay Lightning (2005–06) ||14–5–1 || 
|- align="center" bgcolor="#FFBBBB"
|21||L||November 22, 2005||3–5 || align="left"|  Ottawa Senators (2005–06) ||14–6–1 || 
|- align="center" bgcolor="#CCFFCC" 
|22||W||November 25, 2005||4–3 SO|| align="left"|  Toronto Maple Leafs (2005–06) ||15–6–1 || 
|- align="center" bgcolor="#FFBBBB"
|23||L||November 27, 2005||2–5 || align="left"|  Atlanta Thrashers (2005–06) ||15–7–1 || 
|- align="center" bgcolor="#CCFFCC" 
|24||W||November 29, 2005||4–3 OT|| align="left"| @ Atlanta Thrashers (2005–06) ||16–7–1 || 
|-

|- align="center" 
|25||L||December 2, 2005||4–5 SO|| align="left"| @ Dallas Stars (2005–06) ||16–7–2 || 
|- align="center" bgcolor="#FFBBBB"
|26||L||December 3, 2005||4–8 || align="left"| @ Phoenix Coyotes (2005–06) ||16–8–2 || 
|- align="center" bgcolor="#CCFFCC" 
|27||W||December 6, 2005||6–2 || align="left"| @ Mighty Ducks of Anaheim (2005–06) ||17–8–2 || 
|- align="center" bgcolor="#CCFFCC" 
|28||W||December 8, 2005||3–2 || align="left"| @ Los Angeles Kings (2005–06) ||18–8–2 || 
|- align="center" bgcolor="#FFBBBB"
|29||L||December 10, 2005||3–4 || align="left"| @ San Jose Sharks (2005–06) ||18–9–2 || 
|- align="center" bgcolor="#CCFFCC" 
|30||W||December 13, 2005||5–3 || align="left"|  Chicago Blackhawks (2005–06) ||19–9–2 || 
|- align="center" bgcolor="#CCFFCC" 
|31||W||December 15, 2005||2–1 || align="left"|  Columbus Blue Jackets (2005–06) ||20–9–2 || 
|- align="center" bgcolor="#CCFFCC" 
|32||W||December 17, 2005||4–1 || align="left"|  New Jersey Devils (2005–06) ||21–9–2 || 
|- align="center" bgcolor="#CCFFCC" 
|33||W||December 20, 2005||6–4 || align="left"|  Tampa Bay Lightning (2005–06) ||22–9–2 || 
|- align="center" bgcolor="#CCFFCC" 
|34||W||December 23, 2005||4–3 || align="left"|  Florida Panthers (2005–06) ||23–9–2 || 
|- align="center" 
|35||L||December 26, 2005||4–5 OT|| align="left"| @ Tampa Bay Lightning (2005–06) ||23–9–3 || 
|- align="center" bgcolor="#FFBBBB"
|36||L||December 28, 2005||2–6 || align="left"| @ Ottawa Senators (2005–06) ||23–10–3 || 
|- align="center" 
|37||L||December 29, 2005||3–4 OT|| align="left"|  Philadelphia Flyers (2005–06) ||23–10–4 || 
|- align="center" bgcolor="#CCFFCC" 
|38||W||December 31, 2005||5–3 || align="left"|  Montreal Canadiens (2005–06) ||24–10–4 || 
|-

|- align="center" bgcolor="#CCFFCC" 
|39||W||January 4, 2006||4–3 || align="left"|  Atlanta Thrashers (2005–06) ||25–10–4 || 
|- align="center" bgcolor="#CCFFCC" 
|40||W||January 6, 2006||4–1 || align="left"|  New York Islanders (2005–06) ||26–10–4 || 
|- align="center" bgcolor="#CCFFCC" 
|41||W||January 7, 2006||3–0 || align="left"| @ New York Islanders (2005–06) ||27–10–4 || 
|- align="center" bgcolor="#CCFFCC" 
|42||W||January 10, 2006||3–2 || align="left"|  Detroit Red Wings (2005–06) ||28–10–4 || 
|- align="center" bgcolor="#CCFFCC" 
|43||W||January 13, 2006||5–4 OT|| align="left"|  Nashville Predators (2005–06) ||29–10–4 || 
|- align="center" bgcolor="#CCFFCC" 
|44||W||January 15, 2006||4–2 || align="left"|  St. Louis Blues (2005–06) ||30–10–4 || 
|- align="center" bgcolor="#CCFFCC" 
|45||W||January 17, 2006||4–3 SO|| align="left"| @ Philadelphia Flyers (2005–06) ||31–10–4 || 
|- align="center" bgcolor="#CCFFCC" 
|46||W||January 19, 2006||4–3 || align="left"|  New York Islanders (2005–06) ||32–10–4 || 
|- align="center" bgcolor="#FFBBBB"
|47||L||January 21, 2006||2–5 || align="left"| @ Washington Capitals (2005–06) ||32–11–4 || 
|- align="center" bgcolor="#CCFFCC" 
|48||W||January 23, 2006||7–3 || align="left"|  Montreal Canadiens (2005–06) ||33–11–4 || 
|- align="center" bgcolor="#CCFFCC" 
|49||W||January 25, 2006||4–3 SO|| align="left"| @ Florida Panthers (2005–06) ||34–11–4 || 
|- align="center" bgcolor="#CCFFCC" 
|50||W||January 26, 2006||5–1 || align="left"| @ Atlanta Thrashers (2005–06) ||35–11–4 || 
|- align="center" bgcolor="#CCFFCC" 
|51||W||January 28, 2006||4–1 || align="left"|  Atlanta Thrashers (2005–06) ||36–11–4 || 
|- align="center" bgcolor="#CCFFCC" 
|52||W||January 31, 2006||8–2 || align="left"| @ Montreal Canadiens (2005–06) ||37–11–4 || 
|-

|- align="center" bgcolor="#FFBBBB"
|53||L||February 3, 2006||0–3 || align="left"| @ New Jersey Devils (2005–06) ||37–12–4 || 
|- align="center" bgcolor="#CCFFCC" 
|54||W||February 5, 2006||4–3 SO|| align="left"| @ Boston Bruins (2005–06) ||38–12–4 || 
|- align="center" bgcolor="#FFBBBB"
|55||L||February 9, 2006||3–5 || align="left"| @ Tampa Bay Lightning (2005–06) ||38–13–4 || 
|- align="center" bgcolor="#FFBBBB"
|56||L||February 10, 2006||3–4 || align="left"|  Pittsburgh Penguins (2005–06) ||38–14–4 || 
|- align="center" bgcolor="#CCFFCC" 
|57||W||February 12, 2006||4–3 SO|| align="left"|  Buffalo Sabres (2005–06) ||39–14–4 || 
|-

|- align="center" bgcolor="#CCFFCC" 
|58||W||March 1, 2006||4–3 || align="left"|  Boston Bruins (2005–06) ||40–14–4 || 
|- align="center" bgcolor="#CCFFCC" 
|59||W||March 3, 2006||5–2 || align="left"|  Florida Panthers (2005–06) ||41–14–4 || 
|- align="center" bgcolor="#CCFFCC" 
|60||W||March 4, 2006||7–5 || align="left"| @ Pittsburgh Penguins (2005–06) ||42–14–4 || 
|- align="center" bgcolor="#CCFFCC" 
|61||W||March 6, 2006||2–1 || align="left"| @ New York Rangers (2005–06) ||43–14–4 || 
|- align="center" 
|62||L||March 8, 2006||2–3 SO|| align="left"| @ Philadelphia Flyers (2005–06) ||43–14–5 || 
|- align="center" bgcolor="#FFBBBB"
|63||L||March 10, 2006||3–5 || align="left"| @ Florida Panthers (2005–06) ||43–15–5 || 
|- align="center" 
|64||L||March 11, 2006||3–4 OT|| align="left"| @ Florida Panthers (2005–06) ||43–15–6 || 
|- align="center" bgcolor="#CCFFCC" 
|65||W||March 14, 2006||5–3 || align="left"|  New York Rangers (2005–06) ||44–15–6 || 
|- align="center" bgcolor="#CCFFCC" 
|66||W||March 16, 2006||5–1 || align="left"| @ Montreal Canadiens (2005–06) ||45–15–6 || 
|- align="center" bgcolor="#FFBBBB"
|67||L||March 18, 2006||2–4 || align="left"| @ Boston Bruins (2005–06) ||45–16–6 || 
|- align="center" bgcolor="#FFBBBB"
|68||L||March 21, 2006||2–3 || align="left"| @ Toronto Maple Leafs (2005–06) ||45–17–6 || 
|- align="center" bgcolor="#CCFFCC" 
|69||W||March 22, 2006||4–3 || align="left"| @ Buffalo Sabres (2005–06) ||46–17–6 || 
|- align="center" bgcolor="#FFBBBB"
|70||L||March 25, 2006||1–3 || align="left"|  Washington Capitals (2005–06) ||46–18–6 || 
|- align="center" bgcolor="#CCFFCC" 
|71||W||March 27, 2006||2–1 || align="left"|  Tampa Bay Lightning (2005–06) ||47–18–6 || 
|- align="center" bgcolor="#FFBBBB"
|72||L||March 29, 2006||1–5 || align="left"|  Washington Capitals (2005–06) ||47–19–6 || 
|- align="center" bgcolor="#CCFFCC" 
|73||W||March 31, 2006||3–2 || align="left"|  Florida Panthers (2005–06) ||48–19–6 || 
|-

|- align="center" bgcolor="#FFBBBB"
|74||L||April 1, 2006||2–5 || align="left"| @ Atlanta Thrashers (2005–06) ||48–20–6 || 
|- align="center" bgcolor="#CCFFCC" 
|75||W||April 3, 2006||6–5 OT|| align="left"|  Washington Capitals (2005–06) ||49–20–6 || 
|- align="center" bgcolor="#CCFFCC" 
|76||W||April 5, 2006||4–3 SO|| align="left"| @ Washington Capitals (2005–06) ||50–20–6 || 
|- align="center" bgcolor="#CCFFCC" 
|77||W||April 7, 2006||4–3 || align="left"| @ Washington Capitals (2005–06) ||51–20–6 || 
|- align="center" bgcolor="#FFBBBB"
|78||L||April 8, 2006||2–5 || align="left"| @ Atlanta Thrashers (2005–06) ||51–21–6 || 
|- align="center" 
|79||L||April 11, 2006||3–4 OT|| align="left"|  New Jersey Devils (2005–06) ||51–21–7 || 
|- align="center" bgcolor="#CCFFCC" 
|80||W||April 14, 2006||5–4 SO|| align="left"|  Tampa Bay Lightning (2005–06) ||52–21–7 || 
|- align="center" 
|81||L||April 15, 2006||2–3 OT|| align="left"| @ Tampa Bay Lightning (2005–06) ||52–21–8 || 
|- align="center" bgcolor="#FFBBBB"
|82||L||April 18, 2006||0–4 || align="left"|  Buffalo Sabres (2005–06) ||52–22–8 || 
|-

|-
| Legend:

Playoffs

|- align="center" bgcolor="#FFBBBB" 
|1||L||April 22, 2006||1–6 || align="left"| Montreal Canadiens || Canadiens lead 1–0 || 
|- align="center" bgcolor="#FFBBBB" 
|2||L||April 24, 2006||5–6 OT || align="left"| Montreal Canadiens || Canadiens lead 2–0 || 
|- align="center" bgcolor="#CCFFCC" 
|3||W||April 26, 2006||2–1 OT || align="left"| @ Montreal Canadiens || Canadiens lead 2–1 || 
|- align="center" bgcolor="#CCFFCC" 
|4||W||April 28, 2006||3–2 || align="left"| @ Montreal Canadiens || Series tied 2–2 || 
|- align="center" bgcolor="#CCFFCC" 
|5||W||April 30, 2006||2–1 || align="left"| Montreal Canadiens || Hurricanes lead 3–2 || 
|- align="center" bgcolor="#CCFFCC" 
|6||W||May 2, 2006||2–1 OT || align="left"| @ Montreal Canadiens || Hurricanes win 4–2 || 
|-

|- align=center bgcolor="#CCFFCC"
| 1 ||W|| May 6, 2006 || 6–0 || align="left"|New Jersey Devils || Hurricanes lead 1–0 || 
|- align=center bgcolor="#CCFFCC"
| 2 ||W|| May 8, 2006 || 3–2 OT || align="left"| New Jersey Devils || Hurricanes lead 2–0 || 
|- align=center bgcolor="#CCFFCC"
| 3 ||W|| May 10, 2006 || 3–2 || align="left"|@ New Jersey Devils || Hurricanes lead 3–0 || 
|- align=center bgcolor="#FFBBBB"
| 4 ||L|| May 13, 2006 || 1–5 || align="left"|@ New Jersey Devils || Hurricanes lead 3–1 || 
|- align=center bgcolor="#CCFFCC"
| 5 ||W|| May 14, 2006 || 4–1 || align="left"| New Jersey Devils || Hurricanes win 4–1 || 
|-

|- align="center" bgcolor="#FFBBBB"
| 1 ||L|| May 20, 2006 || 2–3 || align="left"|Buffalo Sabres || Sabres lead 1–0 || 
|- align="center" bgcolor="#CCFFCC"
| 2 ||W|| May 22, 2006 || 4–3 || align="left"| Buffalo Sabres || Series tied 1–1 || 
|- align="center" bgcolor="#FFBBBB"
| 3 ||L|| May 24, 2006 || 3–4 || align="left"|@ Buffalo Sabres || Sabres lead 2–1 || 
|- align="center" bgcolor="#CCFFCC"
| 4 ||W|| May 26, 2006 || 4–0 || align="left"|@ Buffalo Sabres || Series tied 2–2 || 
|- align="center" bgcolor="#CCFFCC"
| 5 ||W|| May 28, 2006 || 4–3 OT || align="left"| Buffalo Sabres || Hurricanes lead 3–2 || 
|- align="center" bgcolor="#FFBBBB"
| 6 ||L|| May 30, 2006 || 1–2 OT || align="left"|@ Buffalo Sabres || Series tied 3–3 || 
|- align="center" bgcolor="#CCFFCC"
| 7 ||W|| June 1, 2006 || 4–2 || align="left"| Buffalo Sabres || Hurricanes win 4–3 || 
|-

|- align="center" bgcolor="#CCFFCC"
| 1 ||W|| June 5, 2006 || 5–4 || align="left"|Edmonton Oilers || Hurricanes lead 1–0 || 
|- align="center" bgcolor="#CCFFCC"
| 2 ||W|| June 7, 2006 || 5–0 || align="left"| Edmonton Oilers || Hurricanes lead 2–0 || 
|- align="center" bgcolor="#FFBBBB"
| 3 ||L|| June 10, 2006 || 1–2 || align="left"|@ Edmonton Oilers || Hurricanes lead 2–1 || 
|- align="center" bgcolor="#CCFFCC"
| 4 ||W|| June 12, 2006 || 2–1 || align="left"|@ Edmonton Oilers || Hurricanes lead 3–1 || 
|- align="center" bgcolor="#FFBBBB"
| 5 ||L|| June 14, 2006 || 3–4 OT || align="left"| Edmonton Oilers || Hurricanes lead 3–2 || 
|- align="center" bgcolor="#FFBBBB"
| 6 ||L|| June 17, 2006 || 0–4 || align="left"|@ Edmonton Oilers || Series tied 3–3 || 
|- align="center" bgcolor="#CCFFCC"
| 7 ||W|| June 19, 2006 || 3–1 || align="left"| Edmonton Oilers || Hurricanes win 4–3 || 
|-

|-
| Legend:

Player statistics

Scoring
 Position abbreviations: C = Center; D = Defense; G = Goaltender; LW = Left Wing; RW = Right Wing
  = Joined team via a transaction (e.g., trade, waivers, signing) during the season. Stats reflect time with the Hurricanes only.
  = Left team via a transaction (e.g., trade, waivers, release) during the season. Stats reflect time with the Hurricanes only.

Goaltending

Awards and honors

Awards

Transactions
The Hurricanes were involved in the following transactions from February 17, 2005, the day after the 2004–05 NHL season was officially cancelled, through June 19, 2006, the day of the deciding game of the 2006 Stanley Cup Finals.

Trades

Players acquired

Players lost

Signings

Draft picks

Notes

References

Carolina
Stanley Cup championship seasons
Eastern Conference (NHL) championship seasons
Carolina Hurricanes seasons
Carolina Hurricanes seasons
Hurr
Hurr